Coldwater Flat is  an album by jazz group The Three Sounds featuring performances with an orchestra arranged by Oliver Nelson recorded in 1968 and released on the Blue Note label.

Reception
The Allmusic review by Stephen Thomas Erlewine awarded the album 3 stars stating "One of the primary attractions of the Three Sounds' sound was its simplicity and their ability to find so much variation within the trio format. That magic is somewhat lost with the orchestra, which tends to overwhelm the trio. More than anything, that is what prevents Coldwater Flat from ranking among the group's finest efforts, but the glossy production has its appealing moments as well, and the record does function well as pleasant background music, even if it veers too close to easy listening to be true jazz".

Track listing
 "Lonely Bottles" (Quincy Jones)   
 "The Look of Love" (Burt Bacharach, Hal David)   
 "Georgia" (Hoagy Carmichael, Stuart Gorrell)    
 "Grass Is Greener" (Howlett Smith, Spence Maxwell)   
 "Coldwater Flat" (Phil Moore)   
 "Last Train to Clarksville" (Boyce and Hart)   
 "My Romance" (Lorenz Hart, Richard Rodgers)  
 "I Remember Bird" (Leonard Feather)    
 "Do Do Do (What Now Is Next)" (Gail Fisher Levy, Nat Adderley)   
 "Star Trek" (Gene Harris) 
Recorded at Liberty Studios in West Hollywood, California on April 10 (tracks 2-4 & 8), April 11 (tracks 1, 5-7 & 9), and April 12 (track 10), 1968

Personnel
Gene Harris - piano, organ
Andrew Simpkins - bass
Donald Bailey - drums
Oliver Nelson - arranger
Bobby Bryant, Conte Candoli, Buddy Childers, Freddy Hill, Melvin Moore - trumpet
Lou Blackburn, Milt Bernhart, Billy Byers, Pete Myers - trombone
Ernie Tack - bass trombone
Anthony Ortega, Frank Strozier - alto saxophone
Plas Johnson, Jay Migliori, Tom Scott - tenor saxophone
Bill Green - baritone saxophone
Lou Singer - timpani
Ken Watson - percussion

References

Blue Note Records albums
The Three Sounds albums
1968 albums